Kiritani is a Japanese surname.

Notable people with this surname include:
 Kenta Kiritani (born 1980), Japanese actor
 Mirei Kiritani (born 1989), Japanese actress
 Nona Kiritani (born 1967), Japanese fencer

References